Gldani is an administrative district (raioni) in Tbilisi, capital of Georgia.

Gldani District includes the neighborhoods: Gldani Massive, Avchala, Mukhiani, Gldanula.

References

Districts of Tbilisi